Estrela d'Oeste is a municipality in the state of São Paulo, Brazil. The population is 8,419 (2020 est.) in an area of 296.3 km2. Estrela d'Oeste belongs to the Mesoregion of São José do Rio Preto.

History 

The area of Estrela d´Oeste was first explored at the beginning of the 20th century. Settlement started in 1942, and in 1949 it became an independent municipality by separation from Fernandópolis.

Demography

Census Data - 2010

Total Population: 8208
 Urban: 6831
 Rural: 1377
 Men: 4133
 Women: 4075
Population density (inhabitants / Km ²): 27.69

Census Data - 2000
 Infant mortality to 1 year (per thousand): 10.43
 Life expectancy (years): 74.42
 Fertility rate (children per woman): 1.96
  Literacy Rate: 87.26%
 Human Development Index (HDI): 0.792
 Income HDI: 0.705
 HDI Longevity: 0.824
 HDI Education: 0.848
(Source: IPEADATA)

References

Municipalities in São Paulo (state)